Opossums are members of the marsupial order Didelphimorphia endemic to the Americas. The largest order of marsupials in the Western Hemisphere, it comprises 93 species in 18 genera. Opossums originated in South America and entered North America in the Great American Interchange following the connection of North and South America.

The Virginia opossum is the only species found in the United States and Canada. It is often simply referred to as an opossum, and in North America it is commonly referred to as a possum (sometimes rendered as possum in written form to indicate the dropped "o"). Possums should not be confused with the Australasian arboreal marsupials of suborder Phalangeriformes that are also called possums because of their resemblance to the Didelphimorphia. The opossum is typically a nonaggressive animal.

Etymology 
The word opossum is borrowed from the Powhatan language and was first recorded between 1607 and 1611 by John Smith (as opassom) and William Strachey (as aposoum). Siebert reconstructs the word phonemically as /a·passem/. Possum was first recorded in 1613. Both men encountered the language at the English settlement of Jamestown, Virginia, which Smith helped to found and where Strachey later served as its first secretary. Strachey's notes describe the opossum as a "beast in bigness of a pig and in taste alike," while Smith recorded it "hath an head like a swine ... tail like a rat ... of the bigness of a cat." The Powhatan word ultimately derives from a Proto-Algonquian word (*wa·p-aʔθemwa) meaning "white dog or dog-like beast."

Following the arrival of Europeans in Australia, the term possum was borrowed to describe distantly related Australian marsupials of the suborder Phalangeriformes, which are more closely related to other Australian marsupials such as kangaroos.

They similarly have didelphimorphia, two (di) wombs (delphus), the second being a non-bilateral marsupial womb (nursing-pouch).

Evolution 

Opossums are frequently considered to be "living fossils", and as a result are often used to approximate the ancestral therian condition in comparative studies. However, this is inaccurate, as the oldest opossum fossils are from the early Miocene (roughly 20 million years old). The last common ancestor of all living opossums approximately dates to the Oligocene-Miocene boundary (23 million years ago) and is at most no older than Oligocene in age. Many extinct metatherians once considered early opossums, such as Alphadon, Peradectes, Herpetotherium, and Pucadelphys, have since been recognized to have been previously grouped with opossums on the basis of plesiomorphies and are now considered to represent older branches of Metatheria only distantly related to modern opossums.

Opossums probably originated in the Amazonia region of northern South America, where they began their initial diversification. They were minor components of South American mammal faunas until the late Miocene, when they began to diversify rapidly. Prior to this time the ecological niches presently occupied by opossums were occupied by other groups of metatherians such as paucituberculatans and sparassodonts
Large opossums like Didelphis show a pattern of gradually increasing in size over geologic time as sparassodont diversity declined. Several groups of opossums, including Thylophorops, Thylatheridium, Hyperdidelphys, and sparassocynids developed carnivorous adaptations during the late Miocene-Pliocene, prior to the arrival of carnivorans in South America. Most of these groups with the exception of Lutreolina are now extinct.

Characteristics 

Didelphimorphs are small to medium-sized marsupials that grow to the size of a house cat. They tend to be semi-arboreal omnivores, although there are many exceptions. Most members of this order have long snouts, a narrow braincase, and a prominent sagittal crest. The dental formula is:  teeth. By mammalian standards, this is an unusually full jaw. The incisors are very small, the canines large, and the molars are tricuspid.

Didelphimorphs have a plantigrade stance (feet flat on the ground) and the hind feet have an opposable digit with no claw. Like some New World monkeys, some opossums have prehensile tails. Like that of all marsupials, the fur consists of awn hair only; many females have a pouch. The tail and parts of the feet bear scutes. The stomach is simple, with a small cecum. Like most marsupials, the male opossum has a forked penis bearing twin glandes.

Although all living opossums are essentially opportunistic omnivores, different species vary in the amount of meat and vegetation they include in their diet. Members of the Caluromyinae are essentially frugivorous; whereas the lutrine opossum and Patagonian opossum primarily feed on other animals. The water opossum or yapok (Chironectes minimus) is particularly unusual, as it is the only living semi-aquatic marsupial, using its webbed hindlimbs to dive in search of freshwater mollusks and crayfish. The extinct Thylophorops, the largest known opossum at 4–7 kg, was a macropredator. Most opossums are scansorial, well-adapted to life in the trees or on the ground, but members of the Caluromyinae and Glironiinae are primarily arboreal, whereas species of Metachirus, Monodelphis, and to a lesser degree Didelphis show adaptations for life on the ground. Metachirus nudicaudatus, found in the upper Amazon basin, consumes fruit seeds, small vertebrate creatures like birds and reptiles and invertebrates like crayfish and snails, but seems to be mainly insectivorous.

Reproduction and life cycle 

As a marsupial, the female opossum has a reproductive system that includes a bifurcated vagina and a divided uterus; many have a marsupium, the pouch. The average estrous cycle of the opossum is about 28 days.  Opossums do possess a placenta, but it is short-lived, simple in structure, and, unlike that of placental mammals, not fully functional. The young are therefore born at a very early stage, although the gestation period is similar to that of many other small marsupials, at only 12 to 14 days. They give birth to litters of up to 20 young. Once born, the offspring must find their way into the marsupium, if present, to hold on to and nurse from a teat. Baby opossums, like their Australian cousins, are called joeys. Female opossums often give birth to very large numbers of young, most of which fail to attach to a teat, although as many as thirteen young can attach, and therefore survive, depending on species. The young are weaned between 70 and 125 days, when they detach from the teat and leave the pouch. The opossum lifespan is unusually short for a mammal of its size, usually only one to two years in the wild and as long as four or more years in captivity. Senescence is rapid.

The species are moderately sexually dimorphic with males usually being slightly larger, much heavier, and having larger canines than females. The largest difference between the opossum and non-marsupial mammals is the bifurcated penis of the male and bifurcated vagina of the female (the source of the term didelphimorph, from the Greek didelphys, meaning "double-wombed"). Opossum spermatozoa exhibit sperm-pairing, forming conjugate pairs in the epididymis. This may ensure that flagella movement can be accurately coordinated for maximal motility. Conjugate pairs dissociate into separate spermatozoa before fertilization.

Behavior 

Opossums are usually solitary and nomadic, staying in one area as long as food and water are easily available. Some families will group together in ready-made burrows or even under houses. Though they will temporarily occupy abandoned burrows, they do not dig or put much effort into building their own. As nocturnal animals, they favor dark, secure areas. These areas may be below ground or above.

When threatened or harmed, they will "play possum", mimicking the appearance and smell of a sick or dead animal. This physiological response is involuntary (like fainting), rather than a conscious act.  In the case of baby opossums, however, the brain does not always react this way at the appropriate moment, and therefore they often fail to "play dead" when threatened. When an opossum is "playing possum", the animal's lips are drawn back, the teeth are bared, saliva foams around the mouth, the eyes close or half-close, and a foul-smelling fluid is secreted from the anal glands. The stiff, curled form can be prodded, turned over, and even carried away without reaction. The animal will typically regain consciousness after a period of a few minutes to four hours, a process that begins with a slight twitching of the ears.

Some species of opossums have prehensile tails, although dangling by the tail is more common among juveniles. An opossum may also use its tail as a brace and a fifth limb when climbing. The tail is occasionally used as a grip to carry bunches of leaves or bedding materials to the nest. A mother will sometimes carry her young upon her back, where they will cling tightly even when she is climbing or running.

Threatened opossums (especially males) will growl deeply, raising their pitch as the threat becomes more urgent. Males make a clicking "smack" noise out of the side of their mouths as they wander in search of a mate, and females will sometimes repeat the sound in return. When separated or distressed, baby opossums will make a sneezing noise to signal their mother.  The mother in return makes a clicking sound and waits for the baby to find her. If threatened, the baby will open its mouth and quietly hiss until the threat is gone.

Diet 
Opossums eat dead animals, insects, rodents and birds. They also feed on eggs, frogs, plants, fruits and grain. One source notes their need for high amounts of calcium. To fulfill this need, opossums eat the skeletal remains of rodents and roadkill animals. They will also eat dog food, cat food and human food waste.

Many large opossums (Didelphini) are immune to the venom of rattlesnakes and pit vipers (Crotalinae) and regularly prey upon these snakes. This adaptation seems to be unique to the Didelphini, as their closest relative, the brown four-eyed opossum, is not immune to snake venom. Similar adaptations are seen in other small predatory mammals such as mongooses and hedgehogs. Didelphin opossums and crotaline vipers have been suggested to be in an evolutionary arms race. Some authors have suggested that this adaptation originally arose as a defense mechanism, allowing a rare reversal of an evolutionary arms race where the former prey has become the predator, whereas others have suggested it arose as a predatory adaptation given that it also occurs in other predatory mammals and does not occur in opossums that do not regularly eat other vertebrates. The fer-de-lance, one of the most venomous snakes in the New World, may have developed its highly potent venom as a means to prey on or a defense mechanism against large opossums.

A widely publicized 2009 study by the Cary Institute indicated that Virginia opossums in a laboratory setting could eat thousands of ticks per week grooming. However, subsequent studies of the stomach contents of wild Virginia opossums have not found any ticks in their diet.

Habitat 

Opossums are found in North, Central, and South America. The Virginia opossum lives in regions as far north as Canada and as far south as Central America, while other types of opossums only inhabit countries south of the United States. The Virginia opossum can often be found in wooded areas, though its habitat may vary widely. Opossums are generally found in areas like forests, shrubland, mangrove swamps, rainforests and eucalyptus forests. Opossums have been found moving northward in recent years.

Hunting and foodways 
The Virginia opossum was once widely hunted and consumed in the United States. Opossum farms have been operated in the United States in the past. Sweet potatoes were eaten together with the opossum in the American South. In 1909, a "Possum and 'Taters" banquet was held in Atlanta to honor President-elect William Howard Taft.   South Carolina cuisine includes opossum, and President Jimmy Carter hunted opossums in addition to other small game. Raccoon, opossum, partridges, prairie hen and frogs were among the fare Mark Twain recorded as part of American cookery.

In Dominica, Grenada, Trinidad, Saint Lucia and Saint Vincent and the Grenadines, the common opossum or manicou is popular and can only be hunted during certain times of the year owing to overhunting. The meat is traditionally prepared by smoking, then stewing. It is light and fine-grained, but the musk glands must be removed as part of preparation. The meat can be used in place of rabbit and chicken in recipes. Historically, hunters in the Caribbean would place a barrel with fresh or rotten fruit to attract opossums that would feed on the fruit or insects.

In northern/central Mexico, opossums are known as tlacuache or tlacuatzin. Their tails are eaten as a folk remedy to improve fertility. In the Yucatán peninsula they are known in the Yucatec Mayan language as "och" and they are not considered part of the regular diet by Mayan people, but still considered edible in times of famine.

Opossum oil (possum grease) is high in essential fatty acids and has been used as a chest rub and a carrier for arthritis remedies given as salves.

Opossum pelts have long been part of the fur trade.

Classification 

Classification based on Voss and Jansa (2009), species based on the American Society of Mammalogists (2021)

 Family Didelphidae
 Subfamily Glironiinae
 Genus Glironia
 Bushy-tailed opossum (Glironia venusta)
 Subfamily Caluromyinae
 Genus Caluromys 
 Subgenus Caluromys
 Bare-tailed woolly opossum (Caluromys philander)
 Subgenus Mallodelphys
 Derby's woolly opossum (Caluromys derbianus)
 Brown-eared woolly opossum (Caluromys lanatus)
 Genus Caluromysiops
 Black-shouldered opossum (Caluromysiops irrupta)
 Subfamily Hyladelphinae
 Genus Hyladelphys
 Kalinowski's mouse opossum (Hyladelphys kalinowskii)
 Genus †Sairadelphys
 †Sairadelphys tocantinensis
 Subfamily Didelphinae
 Tribe Metachirini 
 Genus Metachirus
 Guianan brown four-eyed opossum (Metachirus nudicaudatus)
Common brown four-eyed opossum (Metachirus myosuros)
 Tribe Didelphini 
 Genus Chironectes
 Water opossum or yapok (Chironectes minimus)
 Unnamed subgroup
 Genus Lutreolina
 †Lutreolina biforata
 Big lutrine opossum or little water opossum (Lutreolina crassicaudata)
 †Lutreolina materdei
 Massoia's lutrine opossum (Lutreolina massoia)
 †Genus Hyperdidelphys
 †Hyperdidelphys dimartinoi
 †Hyperdidelphys inexpectata
 †Hyperdidelphys parvula
 †Hyperdidelphys pattersoni
 Unnamed subgroup
 Genus Didelphis 
 White-eared opossum (Didelphis albiventris)
 Big-eared opossum (Didelphis aurita)
 Guianan white-eared opossum (Didelphis imperfecta)
 Common opossum (Didelphis marsupialis)
 Andean white-eared opossum (Didelphis pernigra)
 †Didelphis solimoensis
 Virginia opossum (Didelphis virginiana)
 Genus Philander 
 Anderson's four-eyed opossum (Philander andersoni)
 Common four-eyed opossum (Philander canus)
 Deltaic four-eyed opossum (Philander deltae)
 Southeastern four-eyed opossum (Philander frenatus)
 McIlhenny's four-eyed opossum (Philander mcilhennyi)
 Dark four-eyed opossum (Philander melanurus)
 Mondolfi's four-eyed opossum (Philander mondolfii)
 Black four-eyed opossum (Philander nigratus)
 Olrog's four-eyed opossum (Philander olrogi)
 Gray four-eyed opossum (Philander opossum)
 Pebas four-eyed opossum (Philander pebas)
 Northern four-eyed opossum (Philander vossi)
 †Genus Thylophorops
 †Thylophorops chapadmalensis
 †Thylophorops lorenzinii
 †Thylophorops perplana
 Tribe Marmosini
 Genus †Hesperocynus
 †Hesperocynus dolgopolae
 Genus Marmosa
 Subgenus Marmosa 
 Heavy-browed mouse opossum (Marmosa andersoni)
 Isthmian mouse opossum (Marmosa isthmica)
 Rufous mouse opossum (Marmosa lepida)
 Mexican mouse opossum (Marmosa mexicana)
 Linnaeus's mouse opossum (Marmosa murina)
 Quechuan mouse opossum (Marmosa quichua)
 Robinson's mouse opossum (Marmosa robinsoni)
 Red mouse opossum (Marmosa rubra)
 Simon's mouse opossum (Marmosa simonsi)
 Tyler's mouse opossum (Marmosa tyleriana)
 Waterhouse's mouse opossum (Marmosa waterhousei)
 Guajira mouse opossum (Marmosa xerophila)
 Zeledon's mouse opossum (Marmosa zeledoni)
 Adler’s mouse opossum (Marmosa adleri)
 Subgenus Micoureus 
 Alston's woolly mouse opossum (Marmosa alstoni)
 White-bellied woolly mouse opossum (Marmosa constantiae)
 Northeastern woolly mouse opossum (Marmosa demerarae)
 Northwestern woolly mouse opossum (Marmosa germana)
 Jansa's woolly mouse opossum (Marmosa jansae)
†Marmosa laventica
 Brazilian woolly mouse opossum (Marmosa limae)
 Merida woolly mouse opossum (Marmosa meridae)
 Tate's woolly mouse opossum (Marmosa paraguayanus)
 Peruvian woolly mouse opossum (Marmosa parda)
 Anthony's woolly mouse opossum (Marmosa perplexa)
 Little woolly mouse opossum (Marmosa phaeus)
 Bolivian woolly mouse opossum (Marmosa rapposa)
 Bare-tailed woolly mouse opossum (Marmosa rutteri)
 Genus Monodelphis 
 Sepia short-tailed opossum (Monodelphis adusta)
 Northern three-striped opossum (Monodelphis americana)
 Arlindo's short-tailed opossum (Monodelphis arlindoi)
 Northern red-sided opossum (Monodelphis brevicaudata)
 Yellow-sided opossum (Monodelphis dimidiata)
 Gray short-tailed opossum (Monodelphis domestica)
 Emilia's short-tailed opossum (Monodelphis emiliae)
 Amazonian red-sided opossum (Monodelphis glirina)
 Handley's short-tailed opossum (Monodelphis handleyi)
 Ihering's three-striped opossum (Monodelphis iheringi)
 Pygmy short-tailed opossum (Monodelphis kunsi)
 Marajó short-tailed opossum (Monodelphis maraxina)
 Osgood's short-tailed opossum (Monodelphis osgoodi)
 Peruvian short-tailed opossum (Monodelphis peruviana)
 Hooded red-sided opossum (Monodelphis palliolata)
 Long-nosed short-tailed opossum (Monodelphis pinocchio)
 Reig's opossum (Monodelphis reigi)
 Ronald's opossum (Monodelphis ronaldi)
 Chestnut-striped opossum (Monodelphis rubida)
 Saci short-tailed opossum (Monodelphis saci)
 Santa Rosa short-tailed opossum (Monodelphis sanctaerosae)
 Long-nosed short-tailed opossum (Monodelphis scalops)
 Southern red-sided opossum (Monodelphis sorex)
 Southern three-striped opossum (Monodelphis theresa)
 Touan short-tailed opossum (Monodelphis touan)
 Red three-striped opossum (Monodelphis umbristriata)
 One-striped opossum (Monodelphis unistriata)
 Voss's short-tailed opossum (Monodelphis vossi)
 Genus †Sparassocynus
 †Sparassocynus bahiai
 †Sparassocynus derivatus
 †Sparassocynus maimarai
 †Sparassocynus heterotopicus
 Genus †Thylatheridium
 †Thylatheridium cristatum
 †Thylatheridium hudsoni
 †Thylatheridium pascuali
 Genus Tlacuatzin
 Balsas gray mouse opossum (Tlacuatzin balsasensis)
 Tehuantepec gray mouse opossum (Tlacuatzin canescens)
 Yucatan gray mouse opossum (Tlacuatzin gaumeri)
 Tres Marías gray mouse opossum (Tlacuatzin insularis)
 Northern gray mouse opossum (Tlacuatzin sinaloae)
 †Genus Zygolestes
 †Zygolestes tatei
 Tribe Thylamyini
 Genus Chacodelphys
 Chacoan pygmy opossum (Chacodelphys formosa)
 Genus Cryptonanus
 Agricola's gracile opossum (Cryptonanus agricolai)
 Chacoan gracile opossum (Cryptonanus chacoensis)
 Guahiba gracile opossum (Cryptonanus guahybae)
 †Red-bellied gracile opossum (Cryptonanus ignitus)
 Unduavi gracile opossum (Cryptonanus unduaviensis)
 Genus Gracilinanus
 Aceramarca gracile opossum (Gracilinanus aceramarcae)
 Agile gracile opossum (Gracilinanus agilis)
 Wood sprite gracile opossum (Gracilinanus dryas)
 Emilia's gracile opossum (Gracilinanus emilae)
 Northern gracile opossum (Gracilinanus marica)
 Brazilian gracile opossum (Gracilinanus microtarsus)
 Peruvian opossum (Gracilinanus peruanus)
 Genus Lestodelphys
 Patagonian opossum (Lestodelphys halli)
 Genus Marmosops 
 Bishop's slender opossum (Marmosops bishopi)
 Carr's slender opossum (Marmosops carri)
 Cordillera slender opossum (Marmosops chucha)
 Narrow-headed slender opossum (Marmosops cracens)
 Creighton's slender opossum (Marmosops creightoni)
 Dorothy's slender opossum (Marmosops dorothea)
 Dusky slender opossum (Marmosops fuscatus)
 Handley's slender opossum (Marmosops handleyi)
 Tschudi's slender opossum (Marmosops impavidus)
 Gray slender opossum (Marmosops incanus)
 Panama slender opossum (Marmosops invictus)
 Junin slender opossum (Marmosops juninensis)
 Río Magdalena slender opossum (Marmosops magdalena)
 Silva's slender opossum (Marmosops marina)
 Neblina slender opossum (Marmosops neblina)
 White-bellied slender opossum (Marmosops noctivagus)
 Ojasti's slender opossum (Marmosops ojastii)
 Pantepui slender opossum (Marmosops pakaraimae)
 Delicate slender opossum (Marmosops parvidens)
 Brazilian slender opossum (Marmosops paulensis)
 Pinheiro's slender opossum (Marmosops pinheiroi)
Soini's slender opossum (Marmosops soinii)
Woodall's slender opossum (Marmosops woodalli)
 Genus Thylamys  
 †Thylamys colombianus
 Cinderella fat-tailed mouse opossum (Thylamys cinderella)
 Mesopotamian fat-tailed mouse opossum (Thylamys citellus)
 Elegant fat-tailed mouse opossum (Thylamys elegans)
 Karimi's fat-tailed mouse opossum (Thylamys karimii)
 Paraguayan fat-tailed mouse opossum (Thylamys macrurus)
 †Thylamys minutus
 White-bellied fat-tailed mouse opossum (Thylamys pallidior)
 Dry Chaco fat-tailed mouse opossum (Thylamys pulchellus)
 †Thylamys pinei
 Chacoan fat-tailed mouse opossum (Thylamys pusillus)
 Argentine fat-tailed mouse opossum (Thylamys sponsorius)
 Tate's fat-tailed mouse opossum (Thylamys tatei)
 Dwarf fat-tailed mouse opossum (Thylamys velutinus)
 Buff-bellied fat-tailed mouse opossum (Thylamys venustus)
 †Thylamys zettii

References

External links 

 "Possums or Opossums?"—on Museum of New Zealand Te Papa Tongarewa
 

 
Extant Miocene first appearances
Marsupials of Central America
Marsupials of North America
Marsupials of South America
Marsupials
Miocene mammals of South America
Taxa named by John Edward Gray